Eoghan Murphy (born Dublin, 23 April 1982) is a former Fine Gael politician who was a Teachta Dála (TD) for the Dublin Bay South constituency from 2016 until 27 April 2021, and previously from 2011 to 2016 for the Dublin South-East constituency. He previously served as Minister for Housing, Planning and Local Government from 2017 to 2020 and a Minister of State from 2016 to 2017. Recently he has served as Head of Mission on election observation missions to Armenia, Uzbekistan and Italy on behalf of the Organisation for Security and Cooperation (OSCE).

Early life and education
Murphy attended primary school at Star of the Sea Sandymount and secondary school at St Michael's College. He went on to study at University College Dublin (BA, English & Philosophy), and King's College London (MA, International Relations).

His father Henry is a retired senior counsel and author. His brothers Cillian (the actor known as Killian Scott) and Colin, a playwright and journalist, have forged successful careers in the arts.

He dated jewellery designer Chloe Townsend, but according to Evoke, they split in 2019. In 2021, he revealed that an ex-girlfriend received verbal abuse during his term as a government minister.

Career

Arms control
Prior to entering politics, Murphy worked in international arms control, specifically in the area of nuclear weapons disarmament. He has worked for the United Nations Institute for Disarmament Research (UNIDIR) in Geneva, Switzerland, the Department of Foreign Affairs and Trade in Dublin, and before his election to Dublin City Council, he was working as a speechwriter for the Comprehensive Nuclear-Test-Ban Treaty Organization (CTBTO) in Vienna, Austria. In a 2015 Dáil debate on Irish neutrality, Murphy supported ending the triple lock requirement for Irish military deployment to have United Nations Security Council support, on the ground that it makes Ireland subject to Russia's veto power.

Politics
Murphy was elected to Dublin City Council at the 2009 local elections for the local electoral area of Pembroke–Rathmines. He was 27 at the time.

At the 2011 general election, he was elected to the third seat in Dublin South-East, vacating his seat on the council. In the 31st Dáil, he sat on the Public Accounts Committee (PAC), then regarded as the foremost Oireachtas Committee due to its special powers, and subsequently served on the Committee of Inquiry into the Banking Crisis, established to examine the causes of Ireland's property-driven banking collapse which resulted in a national bailout. When that inquiry almost collapsed Murphy, together with Senator Susan O'Keefe, was asked by their colleagues to rescue the final report, which was published in January 2016.

In his first term he also led the Oireachtas delegation to the Parliamentary Assembly of the OSCE, serving as a short-term observer to the Russian presidential election in 2012, and as Special Co-Ordinator for the Bulgarian parliamentary elections in 2013. 

While regarded as radical at the time, they would later serve as the foundation for many changes that were necessary in establishing a minority government after the 2016 general election did not return any party or coalition in a majority position. 

At the 2016 general election, Murphy topped the poll in the redrawn constituency of Dublin Bay South, winning the second seat. He was appointed by Taoiseach Enda Kenny to the minority Fine Gael–Independent government as Minister of State at the Department of Finance and at the Department of Public Expenditure and Reform with responsibility for Financial Services, eGovernment and Public Procurement.

Following Leo Varadkar's appointment as Taoiseach, Murphy was promoted to the cabinet, as Minister for Housing, Planning and Local Government in June 2017. On 25 September 2018, Murphy survived a motion of no confidence which had been tabled by Sinn Féin. The motion was defeated by 59 to 49 votes. In December 2019, another motion of no confidence was tabled against Murphy, this time by the Social Democrats. The motion was defeated by 59 votes to 56.

In the 2020 general election he was elected to the third seat in Dublin Bay South. After the election he continued to serve as minister during the first phase of the Covid pandemic, instituting protections for rough sleepers, people in emergency accommodation and renters. At the formation of a new government on 27 June 2020 he announced that he was stepping back from ministerial politics to focus on reform of his party. He resigned his seat in the Dáil in April 2021.

After politics
On 27 April 2021, Murphy resigned his seat in Dáil Éireann, and announced that he would return to working in international affairs. In May, he was in Armenia as head of the Organization for Security and Co-operation in Europe team monitoring the parliamentary election. He has returned to serve as Head of Mission for the OSCE's Office for Democratic Institutions and Human Rights (ODIHR) in their election observation missions in Armenia, Uzbekistan, Italy and more recently in Kazakhstan.

References

 

1982 births
Living people
Alumni of University College Dublin
Alumni of King's College London
Fine Gael TDs
Local councillors in Dublin (city)
Members of the 31st Dáil
Members of the 32nd Dáil
Members of the 33rd Dáil
Ministers of State of the 32nd Dáil
People educated at St Michael's College, Dublin